Trap House III is a mixtape by American rapper Gucci Mane. The project serves as a sequel to his fourth album Back to the Trap House (2007). The album was released exclusively to digital download retailers on May 21, 2013 independently by 1017 Brick Squad Records and 101 Distribution. The project features guest appearances from Rick Ross, Rich Homie Quan, Wiz Khalifa, Shawty Lo, Young Scooter, Young Thug and Chief Keef among others.

Background
On February 21, 2013, Gucci Mane announced he would be releasing a new project Trap House 3 The Guwop Edition on July 2, 2013. On February 21, 2013, the first song from the album "Dirty Cup" featuring 2 Chainz was released, though the song was eventually omitted from the album. On March 6, 2013, the album cover was released. On April 12, 2013, it was announced that the release date would be pushed up to May 21, 2013. On May 4, 2013, the music video for "Thirsty" was released. On May 9, 2013, the second song from the album "Darker" featuring Chief Keef was released On May 13, 2013, the third song from the album "Use Me" featuring 2 Chainz was released. On May 16, 2013, the fourth song from the album "Traphouse 3" featuring Rick Ross was released. On May 28, 2013, the music video was released for "Traphouse 3" featuring Rick Ross. On August 14, 2013, the music video was released for "Darker" featuring Chief Keef.

Critical reception

Trap House III was met with generally positive reviews. At Metacritic, which assigns a normalized rating out of 100 to reviews from professional publications, the mixtape received an average score of 61, based on five reviews. 

Neil Martinez-Belkin XXL gave the album an L, saying "In all, Trap House III is Gucci’s strongest effort this year, perhaps his best since his 2012 “comeback tape,” Trap Back. The booming production and the Brick Squad CEO’s natural charisma make it so. The two aforementioned Auto-Tuned records also serve as proof that Gucci’s still more than capable of surprising listeners with some unexpected tricks up his sleeve. David Jeffries of AllMusic gave the album three and a half stars out of five, saying "Good times, some redundant numbers, all of it jumbled together, and everything else returning fans are used to (or frustrated by). Just be aware, Gucci's inspired by more serene and soft moments at this point, so call this the most "couch locked" of all Trap Houses and get prepared to sprawl out for a long, low ride."

Commercial performance
The project debuted at number 175 on the Billboard 200 chart, with first-week sales of 2,500 copies in the United States.

Track listing

Charts

References

2013 albums
Gucci Mane albums
Albums produced by Drumma Boy
Albums produced by Honorable C.N.O.T.E.
Albums produced by Lex Luger
Albums produced by Zaytoven
Sequel albums
Albums produced by Southside (record producer)
Albums produced by TM88